Chromis abyssus is a species of damselfish first discovered in 1997 and described in 2008. Adults have been observed living singly or in pairs, whereas juveniles tend to live in groups.

Etymology
Its specific name, abyssus, is a Latinised form of the Greek noun  (meaning "abyss"), in honour of the documentary film Pacific Abyss, produced by the British Broadcasting Corporation, which funded the expedition on which the type specimens were collected. The vernacular name "deep blue Chromis", a reference to both the life colour of this species and the relatively (within the context of the genus) deep-dwelling habits, is suggested instead of the more literally translated "abyss Chromis", so as not to imply that the species inhabits depths commonly defined as abyssal.

ZooBank
C. abyssus was the first species entered into the ZooBank registry with a timestamp of 2008-01-01T00:00:02, and it was selected as one of "The Top 10 New Species" described in 2008 by The International Institute for Species Exploration at Arizona State University and an international committee of taxonomists.

References

External links 

 
 AQUATAB.NET

abyssus
Fish of Palau
Fish described in 2008